Washington Township Middle-High School is a public high school located in Valparaiso, Indiana.

See also
 List of high schools in Indiana

References

External links
 Official Website

Buildings and structures in Porter County, Indiana